Andreas Ritsch (born June 23, 1961) is a retired Swiss professional ice hockey defenceman who last played for EHC Chur in the National League B. He also represented the Swiss national team at the 1988 Winter Olympics.

References

External links

Living people
Swiss ice hockey defencemen
1961 births
Ice hockey players at the 1988 Winter Olympics
Olympic ice hockey players of Switzerland
EHC Arosa players
EV Zug players
HC Lugano players
SC Rapperswil-Jona Lakers players
People from Chur
Sportspeople from Graubünden